The following is a comprehensive discography of Neurosis, a Californian post-metal band.

Studio albums

Extended plays

Live albums

Split albums

Video albums

Collaborative albums

Singles and music videos

References

External links
 
 
 

Discographies of American artists
Heavy metal group discographies